Joshua or Josh Hill may refer to:

 Joshua Hill (baseball) (born 1983), Australian baseball player
 Joshua Hill (Pitcairn Island leader) (1773–c. 1844), American adventurer 
 Joshua Hill (politician) (1812–1891), American politician
 Josh Hill (footballer) (born 1989), Australian footballer
 Josh Hill (racing driver) (born 1991), third generation British racing driver
 Josh Hill (rugby union) (born 1999), New Zealand rugby union player
 Josh Hill (American football) (born 1990), American football player
 Josh Hill (fighter) (born 1986), Canadian mixed martial artist